Mineral cosmetics are forms of make-up that are composed of compressed minerals. Most of these products are pure mineral, and do not contain any oil or wax additives. Some kinds of minerals can have beneficial health results for the skin, combining health effects with cosmetic results. The claim that applying minerals directly to the skin in the form of cosmetics has health benefits, however, has inspired some scientific controversy. Historically some mineral additives have proven to be poisonous to the skin, such as lead. and the mineral Bismuth that can cause a negative skin reaction. However the kinds of minerals used in modern products are not harmful to the skin.

References

Cosmetics chemicals
Cosmetics